Call the Police is an old-time radio crime drama in the United States. It was broadcast on NBC June 3, 1947 - September 28, 1948, and on CBS June 5, 1949 - September 25, 1949.

Premise
Bill Grant, the main character of Call the Police was a Marine who had served in World War II and whose father had been a policeman who was killed in the line of duty. The younger Grant went to the FBI Academy and then returned to his hometown to find that criminals had taken control. He took on the challenge of cleaning up crime in the city. 

Vincent Terrace, in Radio Programs, 1924-1984: A Catalog of More Than 1800 Shows, summarized the program's format as follows, "The stories are hard-hitting re-creations of gruesome crimes, the step-by-step actions of the criminals and the police efforts to apprehend the culprits."

Reviews 
Media critic John Crosby described Call the Police as "[o]ne bad penny which turns up every summer." He added, "The plots move just short of the speed of sound and are wildly complicated, though, I'm forced to admit, fairly ingenious."

A review in the June 12, 1948, issue of the trade publication Billboard said that summer's first episode "was written with punch and verve and brought [to] life by excellent characterizations ..."

Personnel
Grant was portrayed by Joseph Julian (1947) and George Petrie (1948-1949). Libby Tyler, a criminal psychologist and Grant's girlfriend, was played by Joan Tompkins (1947) and Amzie Strickland (1948-1949). Sergeant Maggio, Grant's assistant, was played by Robert Dryden. Actors frequently heard in supporting roles included Ed Jerome, Mandel Kramer, George Matthews, Bill Smith, and Alice Reinheart. The announcers were Jay Sims (1947) and Hugh James (1948-1949). 

John Cole produced and directed the program. Writers were Peter Barry, Frank Lane, and Lou Vittes. Ben Ludlow provided the music.

Schedule and sponsors
Call the Police was a summer replacement program for the three years it was broadcast, filling the time slot of Amos 'n' Andy each year. The 1947 and 1949 broadcasts were sponsored by Lever Brothers, advertising Rinso laundry soap and Lifebuoy soap. The 1948 broadcasts were sponsored by S. C. Johnson & Son, advertising Johnson Wax.

See also
 
Crime Does Not Pay 
Dragnet 
Gang Busters

References

External links

Logs
 Log of episodes of Call the Police (and more) from The Digital Deli Too
 Log of episodes of Call the Police from Jerry Haendiges Vintage Radio Logs
 Log of episodes of Call the Police from Old Time Radio Researchers Group
 Log of episodes of Call the Police from radioGOLDINdex

Streaming
 Episodes of Call the Police from Internet Archive
 Episodes of Call the Police from Old Time Radio Researchers Group Library

1947 radio programme debuts
1949 radio programme endings
CBS Radio programs
NBC radio programs
American radio dramas
1940s American radio programs